Randall S. Street (1780 Catskill, then Albany Co., now Greene County, New York – November 21, 1841 Monticello, Sullivan County, New York) was an American lawyer and politician from New York.

Life
Street pursued classical studies.  He studied law, and was admitted to the bar and began practice in Poughkeepsie. He was District Attorney for the Second District (comprising Rockland, Orange, Ulster, Dutchess and Delaware counties) from February 1810 to February 1811, and from March 1813 to February 1815. In the War of 1812 he served as lieutenant colonel of militia.

Street was elected as a Federalist to the 16th United States Congress, holding office from March 4, 1819, to March 3, 1821. In 1823, he removed to Monticello where he continued the practice of law until his death. He was interred in Poughkeepsie.

He was the father of poet, author and New York State Librarian Alfred Billings Street, and grandfather of Anna Morton, wife of Vice President Levi P. Morton.

Sources

The New York Civil List (1858; pages 71, 367 and 448)

1780 births
1841 deaths
County district attorneys in New York (state)
Politicians from Poughkeepsie, New York
People from Monticello, New York
American militia officers
Federalist Party members of the United States House of Representatives from New York (state)
19th-century American politicians